VA-76 was an Attack Squadron of the U.S. Navy. It was established on 1 June 1955 and disestablished on 30 September 1969. The squadron was nicknamed the Spirits, from its motto Fighting Spirits of 76.

Significant events
 Jun 1961: The squadron deployed aboard  and operated in the Caribbean during the crisis in the Dominican Republic that followed the assassination of dictator Rafael Trujillo.
 19 Oct–08 Dec 1962: The squadron deployed aboard USS Enterprise (CVAN-65) and operated in the Caribbean during the Cuban Missile Crisis and naval blockade.
 Mar 1964: Conducted operations in the vicinity of Cyprus during a conflict in that country between Turkish and Greek Cypriots.
 31 Jul–3 Oct 1964: While embarked in Enterprise, the squadron participated in Operation Sea Orbit, the first circumnavigation of the world by a nuclear task force. The sixty-five-day voyage was accomplished without replenishment. The squadron participated in numerous air power demonstrations during the voyage.
The aircraft were used for limited daylight fighter protection for embarked ASW aircraft.
 29 May–15 Jun 1965: While temporarily based ashore at Naval Station Roosevelt Roads, Puerto Rico, the squadron flew armed reconnaissance sorties during the Dominican Civil War.
 11 May 1966: The squadron’s commanding officer, Commander James B. Linder, was awarded the Silver Star for leading the squadron on a strike against a mobile SAM site at Thanh Hoa, North Vietnam.
 1 May 1967: During a sortie against Kép Air Base, Lieutenant Commander Theodore R. Swartz shot down a MiG-17 with air-to-ground rockets. This was the first, and only, MiG aircraft to be downed by an A-4 Skyhawk during the Vietnam War. Lieutenant Commander Swartz received the Silver Star for his action.
 14 Jul 1967: The squadron’s commanding officer, Commander R. B. Fuller, was shot down during a sortie over North Vietnam. He was released from captivity on 4 March 1973 following the 27 January 1973 ceasefire agreement with North Vietnam.

Home port assignments
The squadron was assigned to these home ports, effective on the dates shown:
 NAS Oceana – 01 Jun 1955
 NAS Lemoore – 24 Aug 1966

Aircraft assignment
The squadron first received the following aircraft on the dates shown:
 F2H-2 Banshee – Jul 1955
 F9F-8 Cougar – 06 Jan 1956
 F9F-8B Cougar – Apr 1956
 A4D-2 Skyhawk – 27 May 1959
 A4D-2N Skyhawk – 02 Mar 1962

See also

 Attack aircraft
 List of inactive United States Navy aircraft squadrons
 History of the United States Navy

References

Attack squadrons of the United States Navy
Wikipedia articles incorporating text from the Dictionary of American Naval Aviation Squadrons